Weston Hospital may refer to:

Weston General Hospital, Weston-super-Mare, North Somerset, England
Weston Park Hospital, Broomhill, Sheffield, South Yorkshire, England
Weston State Hospital, Weston, West Virginia, United States